Advanced Destroyer Simulator is a naval-based video game, published by Futura Games for the Amiga, Atari ST, Amstrad CPC, and MS-DOS in 1990. Players are able to maneuver and carry out a variety of ship functions manually. The player faces various types of enemy ships and aircraft.

Reception

References

External links
Advanced Destroyer Simulator at MobyGames
Advanced Destroyer Simulator at Lemon Amiga
Advanced Destroyer Simulator at Atari Mania

1990 video games
Amiga games
Amstrad CPC games
Atari ST games
DOS games
Naval video games
Ship simulation games
U.S. Gold games
Video games developed in France
World War II video games